is a fictional character, who appears in the American comic book Usagi Yojimbo, a Dark Horse Comics book created by Stan Sakai. Usagi is an anthropomorphic rabbit (Usagi is Japanese for "rabbit") and a ronin now walking the musha shugyo (warrior's pilgrimage). The character has frequently crossed over with the Teenage Mutant Ninja Turtles.

In May 2011, Miyamoto Usagi placed 92nd on IGN's Top 100 Comic Book Heroes of All Time. He also placed 31st in The 50 Greatest Comic Book Characters in Empire.

Creation
Miyamoto Usagi is the main protagonist of Usagi Yojimbo, whom Sakai has said was inspired by the life of legendary swordsman Miyamoto Musashi. Originally intended to be a human, Sakai was inspired to anthropomorphize the character after doodling a rabbit with its ears bound in a style reminiscent of a samurai topknot.

Character history
Usagi is a highly skilled swordsman and one of the best in the land.

Usagi was born the only son of a village headman. His two childhood playmates were Kenichi, with whom Usagi would have a less-than-friendly rivalry his whole life, and Mariko, one of the reasons for the boys' rivalry. Eventually the trio went their separate ways when the boys were sent to be trained as samurai in the Dogora school of Bujitsu (en: arts of war). However, on the trip there the boys witnessed a confrontation where a gang of arrogant Dogora students attacked a lone traveler named Katsuichi. Katsuichi had left the school years ago, dissatisfied with the poor calibre of the students. In spite of their numerical advantage, the gang was quickly defeated by the sensei's unusual, but definitely effective, technique. Although Kenichi was unimpressed by the display, Usagi pursued the departing sensei to petition him to become his student. Katsuichi initially refused, but relented when Usagi stood outside his home day and night through unpleasant weather long enough to convince the teacher of his determination.

For years, Usagi was the exclusive student of Katsuichi-sensei, and although he proved a mischievous pupil who got into various misadventures, he also excelled at his studies to become a formidable warrior. One of those misadventures involved a young Usagi stealing a dying soldier's wakizashi while walking through a battlefield with his teacher. Fraught with guilt over the theft, Usagi began seeing the now dead soldier in numerous situations, at one point having a nightmare that involved Katsuichi morphed into the soldier. Upon his return to the battlefield to return the sword to its rightful owner, Usagi was caught by adult samurai and accused of theft. Instead of summarily executing the young rabbit, they instead began the process of cutting his hand off. Before a blow could be struck however, Usagi's future lord, Mifune, intervened on his behalf, and upon sensing the rabbit's honorable nature, let Usagi go.

At the end of his training, Katsuichi brought Usagi to a fencing tournament hosted by the Dogora school. Usagi won the tournament, his final match being against his old "comrade" Kenichi, who by then was the top student of the Dogora school, and earned his own daisho: the katana named Yagi no Eda (en: "Willow Branch") and the wakizashi named Aoyagi (en: "Young Willow"). The region's daimyō, Lord Mifune, was observing the contest and was impressed with Usagi's skill enough to offer him a position as a retainer. Before leaving to enter Mifune's service, Usagi returned to his village for a final farewell, where he found Kenichi had been staying at an inn in drunken despair, having sworn to leave the school due to his failure to win the tournament, but too ashamed to return home. Together they returned to their village to free it from brigands that were threatening it. Kenichi decided to stay, and would eventually become headman upon Usagi's father's death, which comforted Mariko somewhat against the loss of her other dearest friend. Kenichi and Mariko later married; however, before leaving the village, Usagi and Mariko had a romantic encounter that resulted in a son, Jotaro, whose parentage was hidden from Usagi for years.

In his term of service, Usagi rose to become a trusted personal bodyguard of his Lord and his family. That stable career was destroyed when a villainous rival lord, Lord Hikiji, sent ninja to assassinate the Mifune family. In the assault, Mifune's wife and son were murdered, and Lord Mifune waged war on his rival in revenge. That war concluded at the battle of Adachigahara, sometimes referenced as Adachi Plain, where Mifune had the upper hand until Buichi Toda, one of his subordinate commanders, betrayed him and joined with Hikiji. Usagi's friend and immediate superior, Gunichi, then fled the field upon seeing that the battle was lost. Lord Mifune was killed by an arrow barrage; Usagi performed his final duty, which was to escape with his lord's head to prevent the enemy from displaying it. As he fought free, he had his so far only personal confrontation with Hikiji, which left him with the distinctive arched scar over his left eye. Usagi escaped into the forest, buried Lord Mifune's head, and eluded pursuit by Hikiji's forces. By saving Lord Mifune's head from desecration, Usagi felt he had atoned for the disgrace of losing the battle. Otherwise, he would have felt compelled to commit seppuku. Usagi has since avenged his master's death upon both Toda and Gunichi, although Hikiji remains beyond his reach.

Now a ronin, Usagi traveled the backroads of the region, making a living as a yojimbo for hire. In the course of his "warrior pilgrimage", he made deep friendships with many, including the young Lord Noriyuki of the Geishu Clan and his valiant bodyguard Ame Tomoe, the cynical rhino bounty-hunter Murakami Gennosuke, the enigmatic demon hunter magic swordsman Sasuké the Demon Queller, the brilliantly astute Inspector Ishida, the renegade cat kunoichi Chizu, and the sly street-entertainer/petty thief Kitsune with her apprentice Kiyoko.

In other media
Usagi has appeared in various Teenage Mutant Ninja Turtles-related media.

Animation

TMNT (1987 animated series)
Usagi makes recurring appearances in the 1987 Teenage Mutant Ninja Turtles animated series, voiced by Townsend Coleman. He lives in Feudal Japan on an alternate Earth where other animals and not humans have evolved into the dominating species.

A short pilot episode for an animated television series, Space Usagi, was created but cancelled following the failure of Bucky O'Hare and the Toad Wars. However, Space Usagi was one of the action figures produced under the Teenage Mutant Ninja Turtles line.

TMNT (2003 animated series)
Usagi makes his debut in the second season of the 2003 Teenage Mutant Ninja Turtles series, voiced by Jason Griffith. He first appears in "The Big Brawl, Part Two", where he comes to Leonardo's aid when the Turtle was attacked by shadow monsters. He addresses Leonardo as kappa and the two master swordsmen forge quite a close friendship. They later become competitors in the Battle Nexus Tournament, both fighting with honor and moral purpose. He expresses concern over Leonardo when he was poisoned by a dart, which was fired by the Ultimate Ninja himself, the power-hungry son of the Daimoyo. Wanting to help his new friend, he had Donatello allow him to use knowledge in basic healing abilities to try and counteract the venom within Leo's system. The three later worked together in defending the Daimoyo from the Ultimate Ninja's assassins. Usagi went on to make several other appearances, including as Leonardo's guide when the turtle was accidentally sent to his world, and as an attendant of the wedding between April O'Neil and Casey Jones.

TMNT (2012 animated series)
Usagi appears in the fifth and last season of Teenage Mutant Ninja Turtles, voiced by Yuki Matsuzaki. The Turtles are whisked away to his dimension, (in the episodes Yojimbo, Osoroshi no Tabi and Kagayake! Kintaro) where he forges a close friendship with them; especially with Leonardo, as they are both levelheaded, quick-witted and highly skilled  in "the ways of the sword."

In his home dimension (presumably an alternate reality of Feudal Japan), Usagi clashes with his archenemy, the wolf-demon Jei, who escapes from him yet again. He comes across a ransacked village and meets an extraordinary child by the name of Kintaro. He is tasked with protecting the boy from Jei until he realizes his own inherent superhuman abilities at the sacred Temple Palace. While setting camp, Usagi is ambushed by the Ninja Turtles who are controlled by Jei's evil magic, after brought from his dimension. He welcomes the newcomers and explains his history as a samurai of great strength and skill. Disguising themselves, Usagi and the Turtles try and pursue Jei's Sumo Kuma but are discovered and fall off a cliff.

(Osoroshi no Tabi) In a haunted forest of yokai spirits, Usagi helps the Turtles fend off shapeshifting spirits that capture Michelangelo and Raphael. He appeases them by offering a carrot as a peace offering. Upon entering a cave full of giant spider webs, he is compelled by the voice of his good friend Akemi who is, in fact, a spider.

(Kagayake! Kintaro) Usagi, the Turtles and Kintaro continue their way in the snowy mountains, until they are ambushed by Jei's white ninjas. After defeating to white ninjas, Usagi, the Turtles and Kintaro to reach the Temple Palace, until they discover that Jei was waiting for them. Having the Turtles under his mind control again, Jei captures Kintaro for the ritual, but is attacked by surprise by them, and Kintaro breaks free by displaying his great power, Usagi confronts Jei, until he finally defeats him and throws a bottomless precipice. The Sumo Kuma is also released from Jei's control by revealing himself as head monk of the Temple. After Kintaro sends the Turtles back to their dimension, Usagi leaves to help other innocents, knowing that he will soon visit Kintaro.

Samurai Rabbit: The Usagi Chronicles (2022)

Reprised by Matsuzaki, Miyamoto Usagi makes recurring appearances in the 2022 animated series Samurai Rabbit: The Usagi Chronicles.

(Common Sensei)

(Go)

(Soul Oath)

Video games
Miyamoto Usagi is also featured in Samurai Warrior: The Battles of Usagi Yojimbo. Usagi's first appearance in a Teenage Mutant Ninja Turtles game was in Teenage Mutant Ninja Turtles 2: Battle Nexus, based on his appearance in the 2003 animated series. He was a combatant in the game's Battle Nexus mode, but was not a playable character.

Reception
Usagi is often considered to be one of the greatest comic book characters. Wizard magazine rated him as the 57th greatest comic book character, while Empire magazine rated him as the 31st greatest comic book character, stating that the noble leporine's longevity can be put down to an intriguing mix of historical and cinematic influence, cute fluffy bunnyness, and an ability to slice and dice with stunning efficiency. IGN also placed Usagi as the 92nd greatest comic book hero of all time, stating "despite his charming looks, Usagi is a serious hero whose adventures pay homage to classic samurai films and even the adventures of another hero Groo. And after all these years, Usagi Yojimbo remains as enjoyable as ever."

References

Animal superheroes
Anthropomorphic rabbits and hares
Comics characters introduced in 1984
Dark Horse Comics superheroes
Fictional bodyguards
Fictional characters based on real people
Fictional rabbits and hares
Fictional iaidouka
Fictional kendoka
Fictional samurai
Fictional swordfighters in comics
Male characters in comics
Usagi Yojimbo
Teenage Mutant Ninja Turtles characters